Sintea Mare is a commune in Arad County, Romania. The commune lies on the Crișul Alb Plateau, its administrative territory being 11871 hectares.

Administration 
The commune is composed of three villages:

Population
According to the last census, the population of the commune counts 3661 inhabitants, out of which 50.75% are Romanians,
33.81% Hungarians, 9.64% Roma, 4.94% Slovaks, 0.84% Germans.

History
The first documentary record of Sintea Mare dates back to 1337, while Adea was first mentioned in 1202–1203, while Țipar in 1881.

Economy
Its economy is based on agriculture. Commerce and services have undergone a slight development in the last few years.

Tourism
Situated on a plateau, the natural touristic fond of the commune is not abundant in spectacular sights. Due to the customs
and traditions specific to the ethnic groups of this area Sintea Mare commune is a quite attractive place during the period
of Christian festivals.

References

Communes in Arad County
Localities in Crișana